The men's 4 × 10 kilometre relay cross-country skiing competition at the 2002 Winter Olympics in Salt Lake City, United States, was held on 17 February at Soldier Hollow.

At Nagano in 1998, the Norwegians beat the Italians by less than one tenth of a second, and in 1994 at Lillehammer the Italians beat the Norwegians by less than one tenth of a second. In the previous three Olympics, the winning team beat the silver medalists by a cumulative time of just under one tenth of a second.

Results
Each team used four skiers, with each completing racing over the same 10kilometre circuit. The first two raced in the classical style, and the final pair of skiers raced freestyle.

The race was started at 09:30.

References

Men's cross-country skiing at the 2002 Winter Olympics
Men's 4 × 10 kilometre relay cross-country skiing at the Winter Olympics